Danaea kalevala is a species of fern belonging to the family Marattiaceae. It is endemic to rainforests of the Lesser Antilles islands in the Caribbean.

This includes the islands of: Saint Kitts, Guadeloupe, Dominica, Martinique, Saint Vincent, and Grenada.

Description
The pinna apices are finely denticulate.

Danaea kalevala was named by Dutch botanist Maarten Christenhusz in honor of Finland, his host country. The Kalevala is the Finnish people's heroic epic and national reference.

Distribution
In the wild Danaea kalevala is rare. On the type locality along Trace des Jésuites, in Martinique, only five plants were found in 2003.

Even though the species is not uncommon in southern parts of Guadeloupe, from most other islands the plants are only known from old collections. The species is thus endangered.

This species cannot be cultivated, because the cultivation requirements of Danaea ferns are still unknown.

See also
Ptisana purpurascens a related plant from Ascension Island.
Ptisana salicina, from New Zealand.

References
 Christenhusz, M. J. M., 2006. Three new species of Danaea from French Guiana and the Lesser Antilles. Annales Botanici Fennici 43: 212–219.

Marattiidae
Ferns of the Americas
Flora of the Windward Islands
Flora of the Leeward Islands
Flora of Guadeloupe
Flora of Dominica
Flora of Martinique
Flora of Saint Vincent and the Grenadines
Flora of Grenada
Neotropical realm flora
Endangered plants
Flora without expected TNC conservation status